The Caudron J Marine was an amphibious, two-seat, biplane equipped with floats and wheels, similar to the earlier Caudron J floatplane.

The Caudron J was essentially a seaplane version of the two-seat Caudron G and single-seat Caudron F. The F, G, and J all followed a similar layout with 2½ bay biplane wings, a tail-unit, with a single fin and rudder, supported on struts attached to the wings at the first inter-plane struts and a central fuselage nacelle housing the cockpit and mounting the tractor engine. Two main floats were strut-supported under the wings and a small tail-float was attached to the tail-unit. Power was supplied by a  Anzani 10-cylinder radial engine.

The three production Caudron J Marine were used by the French Navy (la Marine Française) for reconnaissance and artillery observation. On 8 May 1914, René Caudron flew the second example from a wooden platform erected over a gun turret, on the French Navy cruiser Foudre. The first example was powered by a  Gnome 9 Delta rotary engine, with the remaining two powered by  Gnome 7 Lambda rotary engines.

Variants
Caudron JThe initial 1913 version of the Caudron floatplane with  span and  Anzani 10-cyl radial. Winner of the Deauville contest in August 1913.
Caudron J Marine 1914 production version of the Type J, with 3 examples purchased by the Marine Française

Operators

French Navy

Specifications (variant specified)

References

Further reading

External links
Les hydravions des frères CAUDRON

1910s French military reconnaissance aircraft
Caudron aircraft
Single-engined tractor aircraft
Biplanes
Aircraft first flown in 1914
Rotary-engined aircraft